The women's high jump event at the 2009 World Championships in Berlin, Germany was held between 18 August and 20 August 2009.

Reigning champion Blanka Vlašić had spent the 2007 and 2008 seasons largely unbeaten, but high-profile losses in the Olympic high jump final and the 2008 IAAF Golden League final spelled the end for her lengthy winning streak. The rise of Germany's Ariane Friedrich in the 2009 season had seen her take the European Indoor title and make the world-leading jump of 2.06 m. Having beaten Vlašić in three of their five meetings that season, she was one of Germany's best prospects for a gold medal on home turf. Outside of the two top high jumpers, Antonietta Di Martino and Ruth Beitia had also performed well that season and 2004 Olympic gold medallist Yelena Slesarenko was another strong contender.

Vlašić had an unexpected setback before the qualifiers, suffering a deep gash in her head after hitting a doorway, but after receiving stitches she arrived at the stadium in time for the competition. All the expected finalists made their way through the qualification rounds. All but three of the twelve finalists managed the 1.95 m automatic qualifying mark, with Meike Kröger being a surprise second finalist for the host nation through her best non-qualifying mark of 1.92 m. Although the event was largely portrayed as a head-to-head between Vlašić and Friedrich, Russian Anna Chicherova proved to be a significant contender in the final.

Performing before a sold-out stadium, Di Martino and Beitia finished their competition with a best of 1.99 m, leaving Vlašić, Friedrich and Chicherova to compete for the medals. The Russian took the lead, managing 2.02 m on her first attempt, while the Croatian and the German needed two and three jumps, respectively. Vlašić was the first over 2.04 m and Chicherova recorded three fouls, unable to pass the height. Friedrich, who was in third place, twice failed the height and raised the bar to 2.06 m to try to take the gold medal position. Her final effort, although close, was not enough and she finished with the bronze. Vlašić then raised the bar to the world record of 2.10 m, but failed to jump the height.

Friedrich did not repeat the form which had seen her set a national record of 2.06 m at the Olympiastadion two months earlier, leaving Vlašić and Chicherova to repeat their gold and silver medal performances of the 2007 World Championships in Osaka. Vlašić, who became the first to win consecutive world titles in the event since Hestrie Cloete, said that she was surprised that 2.04 m had been enough for the gold medal and she expected to go much higher. Second-placed Chicherova said neither she, nor athletics commentators, had expected her to win the silver medal, but she had overcome prior injury concerns. Although gold had not materialised for Friedrich, she was happy with her bronze medal – her first at a World Championships.

Medalists

Records

Qualification standards

Schedule

Results

Qualification
Qualification: Qualifying Performance 1.95 (Q) or at least 12 best performers (q) advance to the final.

Key:  Q = qualification by place in heat, q = qualification by overall place, SB = Seasonal best

Final

References
General
High jump results. IAAF. Retrieved on 2022-07-19.
Specific

High jump
High jump at the World Athletics Championships
2009 in women's athletics